Jens Christian Bay (October 12, 1871 – April 11, 1962) was a Danish American writer and librarian.

Biography
Jens Christian Bay was born in Rudkøbing, Denmark to Lars Hansen Bay (1828–1894) and Doris Oline Jørgine Christiansen (1828–1908). Bay came to the United States in 1892 and took a position with the Missouri Botanical Garden in St. Louis.  He later worked for the Library of Congress and, in 1905 became a librarian at the University of Chicago.  From 1928 to 1947 he was chief librarian of the  John Crerar Library in Chicago.

Bay was recognized as an authority on many subjects, including rare books, but was particularly interested in botany, English literature, and the history of the American Midwest.  He was a long-time friend of Young E. Allison, an author and newspaper editor of Louisville, Kentucky.  Bay and Allison shared a variety of interests, including the history of Kentucky, Stephen Foster, James Whitcomb Riley, Robert Louis Stevenson, and Charles Dickens.  Bay was also interested in the literature of his native Denmark, and was knighted by King Frederick IX in 1947.

Selected works
Danish Fairy & Folktales, 1899
Bibliographies of Botany, 1909
Denmark in English and American Literature: A Bibliography, 1915
Conrad Gesner (1516-1565), the Father of Bibliography, 1916
Echoes of Robert Louis Stevenson, 1920
Rare and Beautiful Imprints of Chicago, 1922
The Chalice of the Chipped Ruby, 1922
The Manuscripts of Robert Louis Stevenson's Records of a Family of Engineers, 1929
Om Danskhedens Vaesen, 1933
A Handful of Western Books, 1935
A Second Handful of Western Books, 1936
A Third Handful of Western Books, 1937
The Dummy Library of Charles Dickens at Gad's Hill Place, 1937
The Pickwick Papers: Some Bibliographical Remarks, 1938
The Fortune of Books, 1941
A Heroine of the Frontier: Miriam Davis Colt in Kansas, 1856, 1941
The Mystery of the Irish Crown Jewels, 1944
The John Crerar Library, 1895-1944: An Historical Report Prepared under the Authority of the Board of Directors by the Librarian, 1945
In the House of Memories, 1946
Journeys and Voyages to Nature: A Survey of One Hundred Books, 1950
The Bookman is a Hummingbird: Book Collecting in the Middle West and the House of Walter M. Hill, 1952
Mississippi: Pennestrog om Amerikas Kinge-AA, 1952
God Speede the Plough, 1953
George Washington: Citizen and Farmer, 1956
Bog-Ormen Vejer Videnskab og Visdom: En Laegmands Betragtninger, 1958
Tvende Verdener Modes: En Udvandrerlaeges Minder, 1960
Livet Laerte Mig, 1950 (contributor)

References

Other sources
"Dr. Jens C. Bay Dies; Famed in Library Field," Chicago Tribune, April 13, 1962, pg. B14.
Lawrence Sydney Thompson, Jens Christian Bay, Bibliologist, 1963.
Selected Works of Young E. Allison, Louisville, Ky.: John P. Morton, 1935.

External links
 
 

1871 births
1962 deaths
Writers from Chicago
American librarians
Danish emigrants to the United States
People from Langeland Municipality
Order of the Dannebrog